Aaron Keith Lennox (born 19 February 1993) is an Australian professional footballer who plays as a goalkeeper for Scottish club Montrose. Lennox has previously played for Queens Park Rangers, Maidenhead United, Concord Rangers, Hayes & Yeading United, Aberdeen, Raith Rovers, Cowdenbeath and Partick Thistle. He has represented Australia numerous times at youth level.

Club career

Queens Park Rangers
In 2011, Lennox joined Queens Park Rangers.

On 30 January 2013, Lennox signed a two-year extension with Queens Park Rangers, but failed to make a single appearance.

In May 2015, at the end of his contract, Lennox was not offered an extension and was released by Queens Park Rangers.

Maidenhead United (loan)
On 24 February 2012, Lennox joined Maidenhead United on short-term loan, and a day later made his debut, playing a full game against Boreham Wood, conceding 3 goals. He then went on to keep a clean sheet in the next game against top of the table Woking in a 2–0 victory. In the first half of the game he saved a penalty from midfielder Jack King.

Concord Rangers (loan)

On 3 October 2014, Lennox joined Conference South club Concord Rangers on a 28-day loan. After 3 appearances for Concord Rangers, Lennox broke his finger during training and returned early to Queens Park Rangers.

Hayes & Yeading United
On 19 September 2015, Lennox joined Hayes & Yeading United, but terminated his contract a week later after not making an appearance.

Aberdeen
On 25 January 2016, Lennox signed for Scottish side Aberdeen until the end of the season. He made his professional debut against Ross County in the final game of the 2015–16 Scottish Premiership. In May 2016, he signed a new one-year contract with Aberdeen. Following his loan to Raith Rovers, Lennox was released by Aberdeen on 31 May 2017.

Raith Rovers
After extending his contract with Aberdeen, Lennox joined Scottish Championship side Raith Rovers on a season long loan in June 2016. He made his debut for Raith Rovers against St Mirren in the second league match of the season. He then kept a clean sheet in his second match for Raith Rovers making a string of saves despite tearing his hamstring in the first half of the match. He was forced to play through the injury as there was not a fit goalkeeper on the bench. Five months later Lennox sustained significant injuries to his face and hand during a training match against Dundee United. As a result Lennox returned to Aberdeen in March 2017.

On 30 June 2017, it was announced that Lennox had re-joined Raith Rovers on a permanent transfer. He played the first league match of the 2017–18 season, making a crucial save to allow Lewis Vaughan to score the equalising goal of a 1–1 draw with Alloa Athletic. Lennox was released by Raith at the end of the 2017–18 season.

Partick Thistle
Lennox signed a one-year contract with Scottish Championship club Partick Thistle in June 2018.

Cowdenbeath (loan)
Lennox was loaned to Cowdenbeath in January 2019 until the end of the season.

In his first game for Cowdenbeath, Lennox was named in the SPFL Team of the Week for a solid performance making multiple saves at crucial stages only to concede to a late penalty.

Montrose
In July 2019, Lennox joined Montrose of Scottish League One on a one-year deal.

International career
In December 2013 Lennox was named in Australia's U-23 squad for the AFC U-22 Championship. He played in a goalless draw with Jordan U23s during Australia's showing at the 2016 AFC U-23 Championship.

Career statistics

See also
 List of foreign Scottish Premiership players

References

External links

1993 births
Living people
Australian soccer players
Australia youth international soccer players
Australia under-20 international soccer players
Association football goalkeepers
Queens Park Rangers F.C. players
Maidenhead United F.C. players
Concord Rangers F.C. players
Hayes & Yeading United F.C. players
Aberdeen F.C. players
Raith Rovers F.C. players
National League (English football) players
Scottish Professional Football League players
Australian expatriate soccer players
Australian expatriate sportspeople in England
Australian expatriate sportspeople in Scotland
Expatriate footballers in England
Expatriate footballers in Scotland
Partick Thistle F.C. players
Cowdenbeath F.C. players
Montrose F.C. players